The Kalat State National Party (KSNP) was a Baloch nationalist political party in Balochistan in the princely state of Kalat from 1937 to 1948. They sought independence from British and full restoration of the Khanate of Kalat.

The party was formed on 5 February 1937 in Sibi, emerging out of the reorganization of the Anjuman-e-Ittehad-e-Balochan. Among its leadership were Aalijah Ghaus Bakhsh Gazgi Mengal, Ghaus Bakhsh Bizenjo, Mir Gul Khan Nasir and Abdul Aziz Kurd. Malik Saeed Dehwar was the party's secretary. The party sought the end of the British occupation of Balochistan and the establishment of an independent sovereign state.

References

Baloch nationalist organizations
Khanate of Kalat
Balochistan
Defunct political parties in Pakistan
Political parties established in 1937
1937 establishments in British India
Political parties disestablished in 1948
1948 disestablishments in Pakistan